Nepocarcelia is a genus of flies in the family Tachinidae.

Species
Nepocarcelia fulva Townsend, 1927
Nepocarcelia palustrae (Brèthes, 1908)

References

Diptera of South America
Exoristinae
Tachinidae genera
Taxa named by Charles Henry Tyler Townsend